The 2012–13 Delaware State Hornets men's basketball team represented Delaware State University during the 2012–13 NCAA Division I men's basketball season. The Hornets, led by 13th year head coach Greg Jackson, played their home games at the Memorial Hall and were members of the Mid-Eastern Athletic Conference. They finished the season 15–18, 8–8 in MEAC play to finish in a tie for sixth place. They advanced to the semifinals of the MEAC tournament where they lost to North Carolina A&T.

Roster

Schedule

|-
!colspan=9| Regular season

|-
!colspan=9| 2013 MEAC men's basketball tournament

References

Delaware State Hornets men's basketball seasons
Delaware State
Fight
Fight